Image analysis or imagery analysis is the extraction of meaningful information from images; mainly from digital images by means of digital image processing techniques. Image analysis tasks can be as simple as reading bar coded tags or as sophisticated as identifying a person from their face.

Computers are indispensable for the analysis of large amounts of data, for tasks that require complex computation, or for the extraction of quantitative information.  On the other hand, the human visual cortex is an excellent image analysis apparatus, especially for extracting higher-level information, and for many applications — including medicine, security, and remote sensing — human analysts still cannot be replaced by computers.  For this reason, many important image analysis tools such as edge detectors and neural networks are inspired by human visual perception models.

Digital
Digital Image Analysis or Computer Image Analysis is when a computer or electrical device automatically studies an image to obtain useful information from it. Note that the device is often a computer but may also be an electrical circuit, a digital camera or a mobile phone. 
It involves the fields of computer or machine vision, and medical imaging, and makes heavy use of pattern recognition, digital geometry, and signal processing.  This field of computer science developed in the 1950s at academic institutions such as the MIT A.I. Lab, originally as a branch of artificial intelligence and robotics.

It is the quantitative or qualitative characterization of two-dimensional (2D) or three-dimensional (3D) digital images. 2D images are, for example, to be analyzed in computer vision, and 3D images in medical imaging. The field was established in the 1950s—1970s, for example with pioneering contributions by Azriel Rosenfeld, Herbert Freeman, Jack E. Bresenham, or King-Sun Fu.

Techniques
There are many different techniques used in automatically analysing images. Each technique may be useful for a small range of tasks, however there still aren't any known methods of image analysis that are generic enough for wide ranges of tasks, compared to the abilities of a human's image analysing capabilities. Examples of image analysis techniques in different fields include:
 2D and 3D object recognition,
 image segmentation, 
 motion detection e.g. Single particle tracking, 
 video tracking, 
 optical flow, 
 medical scan analysis, 
 3D Pose Estimation.

Applications
The applications of digital image analysis are continuously expanding through all areas of science and industry, including:
assay micro plate reading, such as detecting where a chemical was manufactured.
astronomy, such as calculating the size of a planet.
automated species identification (e.g. plant and animal species)
defense
error level analysis
filtering 
machine vision, such as to automatically count items in a factory conveyor belt.
materials science, such as determining if a metal weld has cracks. 
medicine, such as detecting cancer in a mammography scan.
metallography, such as determining the mineral content of a rock sample.
microscopy, such as counting the germs in a swab.
automatic number plate recognition;
optical character recognition, such as automatic license plate detection.
remote sensing, such as detecting intruders in a house, and producing land cover/land use maps.
robotics, such as to avoid steering into an obstacle.
security, such as detecting a person's eye color or hair color.

Object-based

Object-based image analysis (OBIA) employs two main processes, segmentation and classification.  Traditional image segmentation is on a per-pixel basis.  However, OBIA groups pixels into homogeneous objects.  These objects can have different shapes and scale.   Objects also have statistics associated with them which can be used to classify objects.  Statistics can include geometry, context and texture of image objects.  The analyst defines statistics in the classification process to generate for example land cover.

When applied to earth images, OBIA is known as geographic object-based image analysis (GEOBIA), defined as "a sub-discipline of geoinformation science devoted to (...) partitioning remote sensing (RS) imagery into meaningful image-objects, and assessing their characteristics through spatial, spectral and temporal scale".
The international GEOBIA conference has been held biannually since 2006.

Object-based image analysis is also applied in other fields, such as cell biology or medicine. It can for instance detect changes of cellular shapes in the process of cell differentiation.

The technique is implemented in software such as eCognition or the Orfeo toolbox.

See also
Archeological imagery
Imaging technologies
Image processing
imc FAMOS (1987), graphical data analysis
Land cover mapping
Military intelligence
Remote sensing

References

Further reading
 The Image Processing Handbook by John C. Russ,  (2006)
 Image Processing and Analysis - Variational, PDE, Wavelet, and Stochastic Methods by Tony F. Chan and Jianhong (Jackie) Shen,  (2005)
 Front-End Vision and Multi-Scale Image Analysis by Bart M. ter Haar Romeny, Paperback,  (2003)
 Practical Guide to Image Analysis by J.J. Friel, et al., ASM International,  (2000). 
 Fundamentals of Image Processing by Ian T. Young, Jan J. Gerbrands, Lucas J. Van Vliet, Paperback,  (1995)
 Image Analysis and Metallography edited by P.J. Kenny, et al., International Metallographic Society and ASM International (1989).
 Quantitative Image Analysis of Microstructures by H.E. Exner & H.P. Hougardy,  DGM Informationsgesellschaft mbH,  (1988). 
 "Metallographic and Materialographic Specimen Preparation, Light Microscopy, Image Analysis and Hardness Testing", Kay Geels in collaboration with Struers A/S, ASTM International 2006.

Computer vision
Formal sciences